Preaching to the Perverted is a 1997 British sex comedy-drama film written and directed by Stuart Urban.

The film stars Guinevere Turner as Tanya Cheex, a New York dominatrix. Tom Bell plays Henry Harding MP and Christien Anholt plays Peter Emery. In addition, several well-known BDSM performance artists appear, including Chaos Clowns, Luci the Axle Grinder, also known as "Lucifire", Miss Kimberly, The Fetish Nun, Suzi Woodroffe, and Tutu.

The film was originally developed by the BBC, but they later dropped the script, believing it would never be suitable for broadcast on UK TV. However, in April 2004, the film was shown on terrestrial TV in the United Kingdom on BBC One.

The film was banned in the Republic of Ireland by then-film censor Sheamus Smith on 28 October 1997; he also banned the subsequent video release of the film. The trailer caused a mass recall of the rental VHS release of Donnie Brasco (which had been passed as an 18), because the trailer had not been classified. 3,300 copies of that cassette were withdrawn and replaced, with a potential fine of €1000 to stores providing it.

In 2013, the film became the first European feature film to be restored and remastered on crowd-funding site Kickstarter by its fans. The remastered Blu-ray became available in August 2013. The film also inspired the 2013 Edinburgh Fringe show Darkest Fantasy, based on the character Tanya's wedding fantasy.

Plot
Henry Harding MP, a British government minister on a moral crusade, hires an inexperienced young computer whiz kid, Peter Emery who works for a Christian computer company called Holy Hardware, to infiltrate the UK BDSM scene. Harding is set on putting a club called "House of Thwax" run by Mistress Tanya Cheex out of business, and is sure that Peter's secretly videotaped evidence of the club's activities will do the trick. However, the virginal Peter takes a liking to Tanya Cheex and finds himself falling for the Mistress. Amongst the locations used Layer Marney Tower in Essex plays a pivotal role for a party scene.

Cast

Reviews
"Witty and kitsch". Among The Top 10 BDSM Movies. The Guardian, Anna Smith. 10 February 2015.

"Turner makes Sharon Stone look like a mother superior, fiendish cameos from Tom Bell, Ricky Tomlinson etc. ... put on your mask and enjoy the party. This ballsy British independent deserves respect". Empire Magazine, Jake Hamilton.

"A mesh of glamour and hilarity ... slick, with an excellent cast ... great dialogue". 'Dillie Tante' The Independent on Sunday.

"The film boasts excellent costumes, good acting and is a great vision of what goes on in a good fetish club. Highly recommended!" Secret Magazine, February 2003.

"Enjoyably offbeat" The Times 27 April 2004 (TV preview).

 "a kind of high-tech, fast-paced, Moulin Rouge for the fetish world...no wonder it was banned in Ireland" Curve Magazine.
 "Original setting ...sumptuous styling ... treat yourself and enjoy" i-D Magazine 1997.
"...the club scenes all look fabulous: intelligent use of colour and light." Erotic Review, December 2002.
"Those who actively participate in the S&M lifestyle may enjoy the lighthearted look at the underground fetish scene, but anyone looking for much more than an offbeat sex comedy is going to be woefully disappointed. Preaching to the Perverted lives up to its name by not being able to appeal to anyone but perverts." Qwipster's Movie Reviews, December 2003.

Awards
Guinevere Turner - 1999 Best Actress Prize, Festival du Jeune Comedien
2002 Audience Choice Award, CineKink Festival

Soundtrack

The CD contains:

 Magnus & Maya – Welcome to the House of Thwax
 Shimmon & Wolfson – Evil Queen
 Magnus & Maya – Journey Into Hell
 Rejuvination – Sycophantasy
 Magnus & Maya – Postman Always Thrice
 Mark Broom – The Alien Spoke
 Magnus & Maya – In Zerbra Suspension
 The Aloof – Mind
 Way Out West – Ajare	
 Magnus & Maya – Enlightenment
 Magnus & Maya – Goodmorning Mistress
 Magnus & Maya – On Wasteland (Requiem Flagellum)
 Omni Trio – Who Are You
 Percy X – Aerobix
 Amethyst – Futura
 Magnus & Maya – Grindecontrol Transubmission 
 Magnus & Maya – House of Thwax

See also
Sadism and masochism in fiction
Operation Spanner

References

External links
 
 
 
 Darkest Fantasy, Fringe show 
 Kickstarter Campaign to Restore & Remaster the film (successful)

1997 films
1997 comedy-drama films
1997 LGBT-related films
1990s British films
1990s English-language films
1990s sex comedy films
BDSM in films
British comedy-drama films
British LGBT-related films
British sex comedy films
Censored films
Film controversies in Ireland
Films about sexual repression
Films directed by Stuart Urban
Lesbian-related films
LGBT-related comedy-drama films
LGBT-related controversies in film
LGBT-related sex comedy films
Obscenity controversies in film